Cadeillan is a commune in the Gers department in southwestern France.

Geography
The river Gesse forms all of the commune's western and northwestern borders, then flows into the Save, which forms all of the commune's eastern and northeastern borders.

Population

Notable people
 Bill Coleman, American jazz trumpeter, lived in Cadeillan from 1975.

See also
Communes of the Gers department

References

Communes of Gers